HASCO may refer to:
 Haitian American Sugar Company
 Help Afghan School Children Organization